A Mittelgebirge (German: Mittel, "middle/medium"; Gebirge, "mountain range") is a type of relatively low mountain range or highland area typical of the geography of central Europe, especially central and southern Germany; it refers to something between rolling low hill country or Hügelland and a proper mountain range ( or Hochgebirge) like the High Alps.

Characteristics
The summits usually do not reach the tree line and were not glaciated after the last glacial period. The delineation corresponds with the differentation between Montane and Alpine level according to altitudinal zonation.

Mittelgebirge ranges
In the plural, die Mittelgebirge (as opposed to the singular, das Mittelgebirge), sometimes qualified as die deutschen Mittelgebirge, usually refers to the Central Uplands of Germany which is a belt of low mountain ranges or hills between the Northern Lowland and the Bavarian Alpine Foreland. 

The ranges stretch from the North German Plain up to the Alps in the south. The northern limitation is marked by the Mittelgebirge threshold (Mittelgebirgsschwelle), running from the Belgian Ardennes in the west along the Rhenish Massif, the Rhön and Harz Mountains, the Thuringian Forest and the Fichtel Mountains to the Bohemian Massif on the Czech border, including the Bavarian Forest and the Ore Mountains, leading to the Bohemian Forest and to the Sudetes in the east. 

In the southwest, the Upper Rhine Plain stretches up to the Swiss border at Basel, accompanied by the South German Scarplands including the Odenwald range and the Black Forest, as well as the Swabian Jura and its eastern continuation, the Franconian Jura. Left of the Upper Rhine, the North French Scarplands reach from the Palatinate and the Vosges Mountains down to the Paris Basin. 

Though located within the Alpine foothills, the Jura Mountains are usually considered a separate Mittelgebirge range, while the Kras Plateau, leading to the Dinarides, geologically forms a part of the Southern Alps.

In Hungary, the Transdanubian Mountains form an extended Mittelgebirge range within the Pannonian Basin. Stretching from Lake Balaton to north of Budapest, marked by the Danube Bend, it separates the Little and Great Hungarian Plain. 

In France, the Massif Central, located between the Western Alps and the Pyrenees, even climbs to  but does not reach the tree line due to its Mediterranean climate. In Britain well-known examples include the pikes of the Lake District, the Pennines, the Scottish Highlands and the Snowdon Massif, in Ireland the MacGillycuddy's Reeks, in the United States some ranges of the Appalachians, such as the Green Mountains (Vermont).

Notes

References

External links

Mountain geomorphology
Central Uplands